Group C of 2022 Women's Africa Cup of Nations will be played from 4 to 10 July 2022. The group was made up of Nigeria, South Africa, debutants Burundi and Botswana.

Teams

Standings

Matches

Nigeria vs South Africa

Burundi vs Botswana

South Africa vs Burundi

Botswana vs Nigeria

South Africa vs Botswana

Nigeria vs Burundi

Discipline

Fair play points will be used as tiebreakers in the group if the overall and head-to-head records of teams were tied, or if teams had the same record in the ranking of third-placed teams. These are calculated based on yellow and red cards received in all group matches as follows:

 first yellow card: plus 1 point;
 indirect red card (second yellow card): plus 3 points;
 direct red card: plus 4 points;
 yellow card and direct red card: plus 5 points;

Goalscorers

References

External links

Group C